The 2021 North American Formula 1000 Championship presented by EPC is the fifth season of the North American Formula 1000 Championship. The sixteen round season begins on April 1 at Carolina Motorsports Park, and ends on October 17 at Pittsburgh International Race Complex.

Last year's champion, Alex Mayer, became a four-time champion in the series, winning every season since the series' conception. Mayer was able to win another championship earning his fifth championship.

Drivers and teams

Schedule

Driver Standings

See also
North American Formula 1000 Championship

References

North American Formula